"State of the Nation" is a song by American band Industry taken from their final studio album Stranger to Stranger. The song peaked at #10 in Sweden and #1 in Italy. It also became a big hit in the Philippines. In the US, the song peaked at #81 on the Billboard Hot 100 chart.

Music video

To create the appearance of an ominous stage set, the production installed blue and white lights, red emergency flares and billows of smoke on the Intrepid. Retired and active US Navy personnel, who managed the Intrepid, also participated in the shoot. Half Hollow Hills East High School students including its marching band, color guard, and kickline, were also brought in to act as US Navy personnel. During the shoot, the students wore their own uniforms. The production company later gave a $1,000 contribution to the school.

In the video, the band performs the song on an aircraft carrier/naval ship at night while being surrounded by uniformed members of the United States Navy and a military/naval band, all who dance to the song. Parked fighter jets are also evident in the video. The lead singer, Jon Carin, has a rack of keyboard instruments with a synthesizer and a computer (not a Fairlight CMI), Rudy Perrone plays a Steinberger bass guitar, Brian Unger plays a Fender Stratocaster and Mercury Caronia plays an acoustic drum kit with Simmons hexapads.

(It is noted that some of the dancing naval soldiers may have been real members of the U.S. Navy while some are only actor/dancers. The navy uniforms indicate a Plebe at Annapolis. It is also presumed that Plebes (freshmen) are actors while some are real plebes, since the song indicates a kind of innocence in the Navy personnel, that are going off to war. It is easy to tell the rank of U.S. Navy uniforms which Annapolis plebes would wear. This is because of the shoulder boards, which are present but have no stripes and because a Midshipman's hat is different than both officers and an enlisted man. The actors do not wear Midshipman hats.)

An alternate version was later filmed and released.

In popular culture 
Due to its powerful lyrics, "State of the Nation" is oftentimes associated with the military. It is also played on some 4th of July celebrations.

The song is featured as a virtual challenge on the social media site TikTok.

Charts

References 

1983 songs
1984 singles
American new wave songs
Anti-war songs
Capitol Records singles